The Kander is a small river flowing from the southern Black Forest westward into the Rhine.

Geography 
The Kander rises at the head of the Kandertal on the Blauen in the Black Forest. Within the first 10 km of its course to Kandern, the Kander loses 650m of elevation. The stream has a total length of 30 km and a drop of 750m to its mouth on the Rhine near the community Märkt of the town Weil am Rhein.

History 
The name Kander comes from the Celtic word kandera, meaning clear flowing.

Transport uses 
Due to the stream's small size it has no transportation function.

References

External links 
 Freiburg-Schwarzwald.de:Kandertal, Kandern, Kander, Marzell, Malsburg in Südschwarzwald(German)

Rivers of Baden-Württemberg
Rivers of the Black Forest
Rivers of Germany